"Minerva" is a song by the American band Deftones and the lead single from their self-titled fourth studio album. Despite the album as a whole containing some of the band's heaviest work to date, "Minerva" itself has an uplifting alternative metal sound and has also been described as shoegaze. In 2016, Consequence of Sound placed "Minerva" at No. 12 in its article "The Top 20 Deftones Songs", with Jon Hadusek claiming that "[in] a way, Deftones brought shoegaze to the alternative metal mainstream with 'Minerva', a crushingly heavy, textured jam indebted to Siamese Dream-era Smashing Pumpkins and Hum [...]". The song charted at No. 9 on Billboard's Alternative Songs chart, No. 16 on the Mainstream Rock Tracks chart and No. 15 on the UK Singles Chart.

Music video 
The music video for "Minerva," directed by Paul Fedor, is notable for its similarity to Pink Floyd's Live at Pompeii concert film. The band is featured playing the song in a desert-like landscape backed by various amplifiers and other stage equipment. It was filmed near the Salton Sea in southern California in 2003, during a sandstorm. The filming process itself was fraught with problems, as the sand caused problems with the recording equipment and lighting setup. The shoot eventually took 22 hours to complete, with Abe Cunningham saying that "[the shoot] sucked" and Chi Cheng calling it "terrible", but conceding that "it [is] a trippy video. I actually like it a lot".

Track listing

Appearances in other media
"Minerva" appeared on the soundtracks for True Crime: Streets of LA and NHL 2004. It was also featured on the soundtrack for the 2005 remake House of Wax.

Chart performance

References 

Deftones songs
2003 singles
Songs written by Abe Cunningham
Songs written by Chino Moreno
Maverick Records singles
2003 songs
Song recordings produced by Terry Date
Songs written by Stephen Carpenter
Songs written by Chi Cheng (musician)
Songs written by Frank Delgado (American musician)
Shoegaze songs